Sulfosalicylic acid is used in urine tests to determine urine protein content.  The chemical causes the precipitation of dissolved proteins, which is measured from the degree of turbidity.

It is also used for integral colour anodizing.

With water it is used as a shuttle solution for the CAS assay to test for siderophore.

See also
Salicylic acid

References

Benzenesulfonic acids
Salicylic acids